Miyagino may refer to:

Miyagino-ku, Sendai
Miyagino Nishikinosuke, a sumo wrestler
Miyagino stable, a sumo stable or heya
4539 Miyagino, an asteroid